Regis College is a postgraduate theological college of the University of Toronto. Founded in 1930, it is the Jesuit school of theology in Canada and a member institution of the Toronto School of Theology.

History

Foundation
Regis College began as the Jesuit philosophy college on Wellington Street in downtown Toronto in September 1930. It then offered philosophy programmes to Jesuit scholastics preparing for priesthood. It was in 1943 that the programme of offerings was expanded to include theology.  In 1954, the Jesuit seminary was formally named Collegium Christi Regis, The College of Christ the King. In 1956 Regis College was accredited as a pontifical faculty (a status it retains) by becoming the School of Theology of St. Mary's University in Halifax, Nova Scotia and thus became able to offer ecclesiastical degrees in theology.

Bayview Avenue site
In 1961, the college moved to a new site on Bayview Avenue in Willowdale, Toronto. There, it taught exclusively theology. The 40-acre site, was offered to the Jesuits as a location for the college by the Sisters of St. Joseph in 1958.

In 1969, Regis College was one of the founding colleges of the Toronto School of Theology. Within its own federation, the University of Toronto granted all but the theology or divinity degrees.

In 1970, the college joined the Association of Theological Schools in the United States and Canada. Membership was granted in 1980, and renewed in 2001 and 2011.

St. Mary Street site
In 1976, the college moved to St. Mary Street in Downtown Toronto, close to its present site. The Bayview site was sold to Ontario Bible College, which became the Tyndale University College and Seminary in 2003. That year, it admitted its first non-Jesuit students. Since 1978, by virtue of a change made in its charter, the University of Toronto has granted theology degrees conjointly with Regis College. Regis College became a federated college of the University of Toronto. This arrangement was renewed for a further ten years in 2004.

Present location

In August 2008, Regis College agreed to move to Christie House, on the corner of Wellesley Street and Queen's Park. It was formerly a female residence building for St. Michael's College administered by the Sisters of St. Joseph who ran St. Joseph's College School next door. The University of Toronto bought the site from the Sisters of St. Joseph and leases it to the college. Construction started to make the house suitable for the college in time for the start of the academic year in September 2009. As part of the leasing agreement with the university, the half of the building closest to the school was converted so that it could be used by the university's Faculty of Music.

The building is located opposite the Parliament of Ontario. It is to the south of St. Michael's College and is next to buildings that previously housed the offices of Marshall McLuhan. The building itself was the former home of William Mellis Christie and after his death it was the residence of his son Robert Jaffrey. Robert Jaffrey had a secret room built in the house so his mistress could secretly live with him and his family. The mistress killed herself in this secret room, and is said to haunt the college.

Academics
In the traditions of Jesuit spirituality, scholarship and service, Regis College promotes an integrated spirituality that emphasizes justice, critical dialogue and academic pursuits. As per all Jesuit institutions, it remains grounded in the concept of ad maiorem Dei gloriam, for the greater glory of God.

Regis College confers three major types of theological degrees: basic degree programmes, graduate degree programmes, and ecclesiastical degrees. Civil degrees are awarded conjointly by Regis College and the University of Toronto and ecclesiastical degrees are awarded solely by Regis College.

Civil degrees

 Basic degree programmes
 Master of Theological Studies (MTS)
 First Studies stream
 Integrating Studies stream
 Theology, Spirituality, and the Arts Stream
 Master of Arts in Ministry and Spirituality (MA in MS)
 The Pastoral Praxis stream
 The Ministry of Spiritual Direction stream
 Master of Divinity (M.Div.)

 Graduate degree programmes
  Master of Arts in Theological Studies (MA)
 M.A. Option I stream (master's research paper)
 M.A. Option II stream (course-only option)
  Master of Theology (ThM)
 Th.M. Option I stream (for admission to Ph.D.)
 Th.M. Option II stream (terminal, with no admission to Ph.D.)
  Doctor of Ministry (DMin)
  Doctor of Philosophy in Theological Studies (Ph.D.)

Ecclesiastical degrees

Basic degree programmes
 Bachelor of Sacred Theology (STB)

Graduate degree programmes
 Licentiate of Sacred Theology (STL)
 Doctor of Sacred Theology (STD)

Notable faculty and alumni
 Frederick Crowe, philosopher and theologian
 Robert M. Doran, philosopher and theologian
 Bernard Lonergan (1904–1984), philosopher, theologian, and economist
 Charles Falzon, dean of the Faculty of Communication and Design at Ryerson University, now Toronto Metropolitan University
 Gill Goulding, theologian and papally-appointed expert for the October 2012 13th Ordinary General Assembly of the Synod of Bishops on the New Evangelization
 Michael Kolarcik, biblical scholar, current rector of the Pontifical Biblical Institute
 Mary Jo Leddy, writer, activist and social critic
Father Jacques Monet, historian
 John Navone, theologian, author, educator, professor emeritus of Biblical theology at the Pontifical Gregorian University in Rome

Honor society
The Jesuit Honor Society's chapter of Alpha Sigma Nu was established at Regis College in 2000.

Gallery

In film and TV

Regis College is a popular location for films and TV series and has been used in the past by various film and television production companies. For example:
 Ice Princess – 2005
 Who Is Clark Rockefeller? – November 2009
 Sherlock Holmes – December 2009
 The Kennedys – July 2010
 Skins – August 2010
 Warehouse 13 – September 2010
 Perception (TV pilot) – December 2010
 Nurse 3D – September 2011
 Covert Affairs – August 2012
 Lost Girl – August 2014
 Pay the Ghost – August 2014

See also
 List of Jesuit sites

References

Citations

Bibliography

Further reading

External links

 
 Lonergan Research Institute, Regis College
 Robert M. Doran's Website
 The Little Red Umbrella News Story

Colleges of the University of Toronto
Toronto, Regis College
Educational institutions established in 1930
1930 establishments in Ontario